Zoran Nikolov (born 2 February 1970) is a former Macedonian professional basketball Swingman who played for Žito Vardar, Nemetali Ogražden, Kumanovo, Balkan Steel, KB Peja and Teteks.

His son Kristijan Nikolov is also a basketball player. He is a member of MZT Skopje

References

External links
 Eurobasket Profile
 FIBA Profile

1970 births
Living people
Macedonian men's basketball players
Place of birth missing (living people)
Small forwards
Shooting guards